Hagley Park is the largest urban open space (164.637 hectares) in Christchurch, New Zealand, and was created in 1855 by the Provincial Government.  According to the government's decree at that time, Hagley Park is "reserved forever as a public park, and shall be open for the recreation and enjoyment of the public." Hagley Park is characterised by its trees and broad open spaces. Hagley Park was named after Hagley Park, the country estate of Lord Lyttelton, who became chairman of the Canterbury Association in March 1850.

Location
The boundaries of the park, which is located to the east of the central city of Christchurch, are defined by both the Avon River / Ōtākaro and the surrounding roadways. The longest road boundary is that along Deans Avenue, often regarded as one of The Four Avenues which delimit central Christchurch. On the western side adjacent is the suburb of Riccarton.

To the north and northeast, the natural path of the Avon River bounds the park. Moorhouse Avenue and Hagley Avenue form the south and south-eastern boundaries, respectively. Along the eastern boundary, the Park is defined by the two kilometre loop of the Avon River, which extends into the side of Hagley Park.

The Christchurch Botanic Gardens (21.14 hectares) are located within this loop and frequent bridges provide connections. The  Botanic Gardens contain a collection of beautiful flowers and trees from around the world. The gardens attract many birds to the park, and sightseers frequently visit the park to view the plants and the wildlife.

The Canterbury Museum and Christ's College are the two other land uses that take up the balance of the land within the river's loop.

Two major avenues subdivide the park into three units. The northern unit is Little Hagley Park (6.96 hectares), with North Hagley Park (87.17 hectares) lying to the south of Harper Avenue. South Hagley Park (70.507 hectares) lies to the south of North Hagley Park, separated by Riccarton Avenue.

Road proposals
At various times, it was proposed to build additional roads through the park. In the 1860s, it was considered to connect Armagh Street with the Great South Road (now called Riccarton Road).

Usage
In its early days, Hagley Park was used for horse races. Hagley Park has frequently been a site for gathering large crowds together: it served as the location for the Great Industrial Exposition of 1882 and the New Zealand International Exhibition in 1906–1907. In 1906, the Australasian tennis championships (now known as the Australian Open) were held in Hagley Park as part of the Grand Slam. The singles event was won by Tony Wilding, who defeated Francis Fisher in three sets.

In recent years, the park has hosted many visiting circuses and open-air concerts. The Ellerslie Flower Show has been held in North Hagley Park since 2008. The park has hosted the Electric Avenue Music Festival.

A golf course (Hagley Golf Club) is located in North Hagley Park.

South Hagley Park contains several netball courts, the Hagley Oval cricket ground and a heliport for Christchurch Hospital, although as of 2019 there are calls to build a helipad on the roof of the hospital itself.

Hagley Park was also the site of a national memorial service attended by 20,000 people to remember the 51 dead victims of the Christchurch mosque shootings at Al Noor Mosque and Linwood Islamic Centre which included the likes of New Zealand Prime Minister Jacinda Ardern and British Muslim convert singer Yusuf Islam (aka Cat Stevens).

The weekly Saturday parkrun takes place at the North Hagley Park. Organized by volunteers, the 5km run welcomes all runners with all fitness levels.

References

External links

Hagley Park Map, Christchurch City Council
Hagley Park, Christchurch City Council
The Christchurch Botanic Gardens

1856 establishments in New Zealand
Parks in Christchurch
Urban public parks
World's fair sites in New Zealand
Tourist attractions in Christchurch
Golf clubs and courses in New Zealand
Heliports in New Zealand
Cricket grounds in New Zealand